Henry Taylor may refer to:

Academics 
 Henry Charles Taylor (1873–1969), agricultural economist
 Henry Kirby Taylor (1858–1934), college president in United States
 Henry Martyn Taylor (1842–1927), English mathematician and barrister
 Henry Osborn Taylor (1856–1941), American historian and legal scholar

Arts 
 Henry Taylor (artist) (born 1958), American artist
 Henry Taylor (dramatist) (1800–1886), English dramatist
 Henry Taylor (organist) (1859–?), English organist and composer
 Henry Fitch Taylor (1853–1925), American artist
 Henry S. Taylor (born 1942), American poet
 Henry E. Taylor III (born 1991), American actor and host

Religion 
 Henry Taylor (priest) (1711–1785), Church of England priest and religious controversialist
 Henry D. Taylor (1903–1987), American leader in The Church of Jesus Christ of Latter-day Saints
 Henry Gordon Taylor (1908–1987), New Zealand Anglican priest and military chaplain

Politics 
 Henry Taylor (politician) (1872/3–1957), Unionist politician in Northern Ireland
 Henry D'Esterre Taylor (1853–1909), Australian banker and federalist
 Sir Henry Milton Taylor (1903–1994), Bahamian politician and Governor-General
 Henry C. Taylor (c. 1814–1889), U.S. politician
 Henry I. Taylor (1862–1943), Canadian politician.
 Henry L. Taylor, U.S. chargé d'affaires ad interim in Panama, 1964, United States Ambassador to Panama
 Henry Wyllys Taylor (1796–1888), American politician and jurist

Sports 
 Henry Taylor (boxer) (born 1914), U.S. boxer
 Henry Taylor (racing driver) (1932–2013), British race car driver
 Henry Taylor (swimmer) (1885–1951), British long-distance swimmer
 Henry Taylor (cricketer, born 1856) (1856–1896), British cricketer
 Henry Taylor (cricketer, born 1822) (1822–1901), English cricketer
 Henry Taylor (cricketer, born 1875) (1875–1903), Indian-born English sportsman
 Henry Taylor (American football) (born 1975), American football player
 Henry Taylor (rugby union, born 1858) (1858–1942), English rugby union international
 Henry Taylor (rugby union, born 1994), English rugby union scrum-half
 Henry Morgan Taylor (1889–1955), New Zealand rugby union player and cricketer

Other 
 Henry Taylor (carpenter) (1823–1891), Wilmington NC based carpenter and builder
 Henry Taylor (trade unionist), British trade union leader
 Henry Clay Taylor (1845–1904), US rear admiral
 Henry H. Taylor (1841–1909), American soldier and Medal of Honor recipient
 Henry Reed Taylor (1866–1917), American naturalist
 Henry Stryker Taylor, Illinois financier
 Henry Taylor (24 character), character on the television series 24

See also
 Harry Taylor (disambiguation)
 List of people with surname Taylor